Richard Kiser (born February 23, 1947), is an American CCM guitar player. Kiser has received over seventy industry awards and was voted the 2009 Instrumentalist of the Decade.

Biography
Kiser taught himself to play the guitar when he was thirteen and joined a gospel group three years later. He began playing professionally and touring in the late 1960s, but stopped about five years later to raise his family, working occasionally as a session musician and playing at his local church. In the 1990s he resumed touring, this time as a solo concert guitarist. He has recorded eight acoustic albums and has two instructional videos.

Kiser is a featured guest artist each year at the Chet Atkins Appreciation Society which holds its annual convention in Nashville, Tennessee. Kiser has shared the stage with performers such as Roy Clark, Charlie McCoy, Boots Randolph, David L Cook, Terri Gibbs, Phil Driscoll, The Oak Ridge Boys and Barbara Fairchild.

Music
Kiser's finger picking style has been defined as being closely related to that of guitar legend, Chet Atkins. Kiser attributes his style to Atkins and designs shows with fellow musicians that showcase the same. Kiser finds himself mostly in religious venues, but has stepped out of those venues to perform with fellow artists such as Country Music Hall of Fame member Charlie McCoy and Jason Coleman who is the grandson of the late Floyd Cramer. In 2013 Kiser received an Emmy Award nomination for his work on the soundtrack for the "Hands of Hope" project. A song that was written by David Meece, David L Cook and Bruce Carroll which brought attention to domestic violence upon women and children.

Business
In 2011 Kiser formed a non-profit company called "Richard Kiser Music Ministries" which handles all of his religious based music affairs. In 2011 Kiser became the president of the Artists Music Guild whose main function is to educate and protect artists against predatory industry practices. They also teach in the public school systems and help with dwindling curriculum inside of the arts classrooms. Kiser retired as the board president due to health issues but remains on the board as an advisor.

Awards
Kiser has won more than 70 major awards, including being inducted into the CGMA Hall of Fame in 2009. He was named Instrumentalist of the Decade by the International Country Gospel Music Association and three-time Artist of the Year the Country Gospel Music Association. He won a Telly Award for his participation in the video production of "Let's Do This Together."

Private life
Kiser lives in Salem, Virginia with his wife of over fifty years Esther. They have three sons and multiple grandchildren.

References

External links
Richard Kiser Official Web Page
Artists Music Guild Official Web Page
Chet Atkins Appreciation Society Official Web Page

1947 births
American country guitarists
Fingerstyle guitarists
American folk guitarists
American male guitarists
People from Salem, Virginia
Living people
20th-century American guitarists
20th-century American male musicians